Old Suttonians may refer to the former pupils of 2 schools:
Sutton Grammar School for Boys in Sutton, London, England
Sutton Valence School near Maidstone in Kent